Justin Steinkötter (born 26 September 1999) is a German professional footballer who plays as a forward for 1. FC Saarbrücken.

Career

Preußen Münster 
In 2016, Steinkötter joined SC Preußen Münster.  In the first half of the 2017-18 season, he scored 14 goals in 13 matches (including four in one game against MSV Duisburg) in the Under 19 Bundesliga. He also made two substitute appearances for the first team in the 3. Liga.

Borussia Mönchengladbach II 
In January 2018, Steinkötter joined Borussia Mönchengladbach II. He made his debut in the Under 19 Bundesliga against his former club, Preußen Münster.

1. FC Saarbrücken 
On 20 May 2021, it was announced that Steinkötter would join 1. FC Saarbrücken on a two-year contract following the 2020–21 season.

References

External links
 

1999 births
Living people
German footballers
Association football forwards
3. Liga players
Regionalliga players
SC Preußen Münster players
Borussia Mönchengladbach II players
1. FC Saarbrücken players